Multan Institute of Cardiology (MIC), is a hospital located in Multan city in Pakistan. It was established by Nawaz Sharif, the former chief minister of Punjab province, in 2016.

History 

A project for the establishment of a specialised, tertiary care centre for patients with cardiovascular diseases, was subject to a range of issues. Despite millions hoping for this project to be initiated, the convoluted bureaucracy consequently delayed it, denying millions, access to specialised healthcare. In early 2003, Pervaiz Elahi, the Chief Minister of Punjab, prioritised this initiative, evident by his appointment of Col. (Ret) Prof M A Cheema as the Project Director of MIC. He has been a pioneer in cardiac surgery within Pakistan and had previously established the Punjab Institute of Cardiology, in Lahore. The centre initiated its outpatient services in 2005, while inpatient services commenced in 2005. The first open heart surgery was performed on 29 October 2007 and by March 2008 over 50 open heart operations were conducted without any surgical mortality.

After the completion of the project Prof M A Cheema, was succeeded by Prof Syed Ali Raza Gardezi to assume the responsibilities of the first Executive Director of the institute. Prof. Dr. Syed Ali Raza Gardezi is an accomplished cardiologist who came from the respectable Gardezi family of Multan. The institute achieved several milestones during the tenure of Prof Gardezi. The construction of a modular operation theatre suite was an achievement despite the medical Fraternity in Punjab not being convinced of the benefits of modular theatres.

Prof. Dr. Muhammad Mujtaba Ali Siddiqui is the current Executive Director of CPEIC after Prof Rana Altaf Ahmed and Prof. Syed Ali Raza Gardezi.

Infrastructure 

CPE Institute of Cardiology Multan is a tertiary care hospital providing comprehensive services of cardiology and cardiac surgery for both adult and congenital heart diseases. It has one of the largest Modular Operation Theater suites in the country. There are five operating rooms with dedicated preparation and scrub areas. The construction of this modular theater complex was completed in 2009 and the first surgery in the new complex was performed in March 2009. The intensive care has a capacity of 20 beds. The hospital has three Cardiac Catheterization Laboratories. The Institute also has facilities of Cardiac CT-scan, Nuclear Cardiology, Exercise Tolerance Testing and Echocardiography.

Departments & Services

Department of Anesthesia 
The department of anesthesia is led by an the Professor of Anesthesia. Their main area of service is associated with post operative care for cardiac patients in the intensive care units (ICU) and providing other anesthetic services to the whole hospital on a 24 hours basis.

Department of Cardiac Surgery 
On an average over 1300 surgeries are performed annually. 

The types of surgeries offered include:

• Coronary artery bypass surgery.

• Valve replacements and repair

• Surgery for aortic dissection and aneurysms.

• Repair of atrial and ventricular septal defects.

• Repair of Fallot’s Tetralogy

• PDA

• Surgery for Coarctation of aorta

• PA banding

• Right Heart bypass in uni ventricular heart

• Surgery for peripheral artery disease

The department is led by a professor, an associate professor and two assistant professors for adult cardiac surgery, and  two assistant professors for Paediatric Cardiac Surgery. The department is evolving into an entirely independent Paediatric Cardiac Surgery Department in near future.

Department of Cardiology 
The cardiology department provides diagnostic and therapeutic services to patients with heart diseases. The department has a twelve bedded emergency and twenty bedded CCU for critical patients. The department is headed by Professor of cardiology and its faculty consists of one Associate Professor and four Assistant Professors.

The following diagnostic facilities are available:
 Transthoracic echocardiography
 Transesophageal echocardiography (TEE)
 Exercise Tolerance testing (ETT)
 24-hour ECG (Holter) monitoring
 Nuclear Cardiology having a dual head dedicated gamma camera. It performs Stress SPECT & Myocardial viability scans.

The Department has two Angiography labs where following procedures are done:
 Diagnostic coronary angiography
 Right and left heart catheterization
 Coronary angioplasty with stent implantation
 Implantation of pacemakers

Department of Pediatric Cardiology 
Being a highly specialized field, its importance emerges from the high incidence of congenital and acquired disorders found in children. It provides services in all diagnostic and several therapeutic areas. The department consists of two consultant pediatric cardiologists. The department is doing regular cardiac catheterization for congenital lesions and has started transcatheter treatment of suitable congenital disorders like ASD, PDA, pulmonary stenosis and mitral stenosis.

Department of Pathology 
The department has modern equipment and provides a complete array of routine and specialized tests.

Department of Radiology 
It provides comprehensive diagnostic imaging facilities round the clock. The following tests are routinely done:
 Ultrasound / Color Doppler
 General Radiography
 Special Radiography
 Interventional Radiography

The department has facilities of processing digital images which are displayed online.

Dental Section 
The primary aim of the dental section is to provide preoperative dental clearance of the patients undergoing valve surgery. However any patient requiring dental treatment is provided this service within the institute saving them the trouble and cost of visiting the Dental Hospital. The Dental clinic is located on the first floor and is run by two consultant dental surgeons.

Central Sterilization Supplies Department (CSSD) 
CSSD is one of the systems installed in Pakistan and ensures sterilized surgical instruments and linen used in the operation theatres and the catheterization laboratories.

Laundry 
The laundry system of this hospital is of European make and is able to clean and wash bulk of hospital linen.

Library 
Textbooks and international journals for doctors, nurses, and paramedics are available here. It remains open till late evening.

Pharmacy 
According to the policy of the Government of Punjab, the hospital pharmacy provides the supply of free medicines to the poor patients. For the convenience of paying patients a retail pharmacy is established in the hospital. It provides medicines at lower than market price. It is located on the ground floor opposite the office of the Executive Director. The retail pharmacy is being updated and upgraded.

Cardiac Surgery Database 
The department of cardiac surgery has a state of the art electronic database donated by Dr. Anjum Jalal, one of the developers of the software. The database presently has complete records of over 4000 patients who underwent surgery from 2009 onwards. It retrieves records quickly so is extremely useful in maintaining consistency of follow-ups. The dynamic lookup facility of the database is also helpful in conducting heavyweight research studies. Such database software is extremely costly, usually over 30000 dollars per year. The role of the database has been recognized and appreciated by both the local and international community of cardiac surgeons.

Clinical Performance 
Multan institute of cardiology is primarily serving the poor people living in the region of south Punjab. However, due to its convenient geographic location many patients from upper Sindh, Balochistan and Khyber-Pakhtunkhwa also visit for treatment of heart diseases. In 2016 a total of 474,552 patients visited the Outpatients Department, 1568 patients underwent open heart surgery, 6468 patients had angiographies and 2947 patients underwent PCI. The institute provided free medicines, as per Government policy, to over 292,900 patients.

In 2017, the institute is going to complete its 10-years of its indoor services of clinical excellence. The data presented above has put the institute among some of the best centers in the world. The charts given below show clinical performance:

Besides such a large number of patients served, the institute has also achieved distinction for performing highly complex interventions and surgical operations. A large number of adult congenital operations have been performed by the team of cardiac surgeons with exceptional results. Complex aortic root replacements have also been performed routinely. Surgical correction of extremely rare conditions (like aorto-ventricular tunnel and ruptured sinus of Valsalva) have also been performed with excellent outcomes.

Academic Achievement 

The institute has a record of having prominent names in its faculty. Prof Haider Zaman, Prof Rana Altaf Ahmed, Prof Ijaz Ahmed are respectable names among the academia of cardiac surgery and cardiology. As a result of the tireless efforts of its faculty, the institute was accredited by the College of Physicians & Surgeons soon after its establishment.  It has trained several cardiologists and cardiac surgeons. The academic activities are a regular feature of the institute. Cath. Meetings, Audit Meetings, and GP training programs are on the regular academic calendar of the institute. The institute has hosted several national meetings including the annual meetings of Pakistan Society of Cardiovascular and Thoracic Surgeons as well as Pakistan Hypertension League.

Some of the publications done by the doctors of MIC include the following:
 Right Ventricular Dysfunction after Coronary Artery Bypass Grafting Is a Reality of Unknown Cause and Significance. Muhammad-Mujtaba Ali Siddiqui, Anjum Jalal, Mubashir Sherwani, Muhammad Zubair Ahmad
 Is there any benefit of preoperative trimetazidine in patients undergoing CABG. Muhammad Sher-e-Murtaza, Muhammad Zubair, Anjum Jalal
 Risk factors of prolonged mechanical ventilation following open heart surgery: what has changed over the last decade? Muhammad-Mujtaba Ali Siddiqui, Iftikhar Paras, Anjum Jalal
 The Outcome of VSD Repair in Older Children and Adults. Tariq Waqar, Yasir Khan, Anjum Jalal
 Surgical repair of Tetralogy of Fallot in children and adult patients: A Retrospective analysis of early results. Tariq Waqar, Yasir Khan, Anjum Jalal

The institute also publishes a monthly news letter under the editorship of Dr. Kashif Hashmi.

See also
 List of hospitals in Pakistan
 Rawalpindi Institute of Cardiology
 Punjab Institute of Cardiology

References 

Hospital buildings completed in 2007
2006 establishments in Pakistan
Buildings and structures in Multan
Heart disease organizations
Hospitals in Multan